Route 3A, also known as Team Gushue Highway, is a currently  north-south freeway on the Avalon Peninsula of Newfoundland in the Canadian province of Newfoundland and Labrador. It straddles the line between the provinces two largest cities, the capital city of St. John's and the city Mount Pearl. It currently envisioned to run from the Outer Ring Road (Trans-Canada Highway/Route 1) to the interchange between Pitts Memorial Drive (Route 2) and the Goulds Bypass (Route 3), but currently only runs between Route 1 and Route 60 (Topsail Road). The highway also serves as an alternative to The Parkway.

Although Route 3A is technically an alternate route of Route 3, it is the only alternate route in the province that does not connect to its "parent" route.

Route description

The Team Gushue Highway begins in the northwestern corner of St. John's at exit 45 of the Outer Ring Road (Trans-Canada Highway/Route 1) in a rural wooded area. It heads south through neighbourhoods to pass under Route 50 (Thorburn Road) before having an interchange with Goldstone Street and entering a business district. The highway now has an interchange with Kenmount Road near the Avalon Mall before passing through neighbourhoods again to have interchanges with Brier Avenue and Blackmarsh Road. Team Gushue Highway comes to its temporary southern end shortly thereafter at an interchange with Route 60 (Topsail Road) on the St. John's-Mount Pearl city line.

The Route 3A designation is only signed at the interchange with Route 1 (TCH), with the rest of the highway signed only as Team Gushue Highway.

History
The first part of the highway opened in 2006 from Route 1 to Kenmount Road. In 2018, the second part of the highway from Kenmount Road to Route 60 opened.

Related route

Included in phase two of the project was a  spur road known as Brier Avenue. It connects the freeway with the Columbus Drive portion of The Parkway as well as Old Pennywell Road.

Brier Avenue begins at a trumpet interchange with Team Gushue Highway and heads through rural wooded areas as a two-lane road. It now enters neighbourhoods and has an intersection with Old Pennywell Road, where it widens to four-lanes, shortly before coming to an end at an intersection with Columbus Drive.

Name

Team Gushue Highway is named after St. John's native Olympic Curler Brad Gushue when he and his team lead Canada to win a gold medal at the 2006 Winter Olympics. There are special curling stone shields placed on the exit signs for the highway along Route 1.

Future

The highway is ultimately projected to be  and will eventually be extended from Route 60 (Topsail Road) to the interchange between Route 2 (Pitts Memorial Drive) and Route 3 (Goulds Bypass). The highway is very well known for project delays, with it originally supposed to be completed all the way back in 2014. It is currently unknown that, once completed, the entire highway will be renumbered as part of Route 3, due to the fact that the only Route 3A shields that exist are located at the interchange with Route 1 (Outer Ring Road/TCH).

Exit list

References

03A
Streets in St. John's, Newfoundland and Labrador